Charles Moulin (1909-1992) was a French film and television actor.

Selected filmography
 Aloha, le chant des îles (1937)
 The Baker's Wife (1938)
 Fort Dolorès (1939)
 L'Arlésienne (1942)
 Le soleil a toujours raison (1943)
 Le bataillon du ciel (1947)
 Guilty? (1951)
The Agony of the Eagles (1952)
 Les chiffonniers d'Emmaüs (1955)
 Napoleon (1955)
 Goubbiah, mon amour (1956)
 La pendule à Salomon (1961)
 A Man Named Rocca (1961)
 Il suffit d'aimer (1961)
 On Murder Considered as One of the Fine Arts (1964)
 Circus Angel (1965)

References

Bibliography
 Goble, Alan. The Complete Index to Literary Sources in Film. Walter de Gruyter, 1999.
 Paietta, Ann C. Teachers in the Movies: A Filmography of Depictions of Grade School, Preschool and Day Care Educators, 1890s to the Present. McFarland, 2007.

External links

1909 births
1992 deaths
French male film actors
French male television actors
People from Montélimar

fr:Charles Moulin